Live in Madrid may refer to:

Albums
Live in Madrid, album by Mick Abrahams of Jethro Tull, 1997
Live in Madrid (TNT album) (2006) - a live album by Norwegian band TNT
Amigos Para Siempre: Live in Madrid, a 2009 live album by Australian band The Ten Tenors
Live in Madrid, also known as Hecho en España (video). live DVD by Mexican pop group RBD 
Live in Madrid (2011) - a live EP by British alternative rock band, Coldplay.